The nut-colored yellow bat (Scotophilus nux) is a species of vesper bat. It can be found in Cameroon, Democratic Republic of the Congo, Ivory Coast, Equatorial Guinea, Ghana, Guinea, Kenya, Liberia, Nigeria, Rwanda, Sierra Leone, and Uganda. It is found in subtropical or tropical moist lowland forests.

References

Scotophilus
Taxonomy articles created by Polbot
Mammals described in 1904
Bats of Africa
Taxa named by Oldfield Thomas